Lily Mazahery (born October 10, 1972) is an Iranian-American disbarred lawyer, formerly a human rights activist, and a source on Iran. She is principal of Mazahery Law Firm and the founder and president of Legal Rights Institute (LRI), a non-governmental organization (NGO).

Overview
Mazahery received her Juris Doctor in 1999 and was admitted to the District of Columbia bar on December 2, 2002.  She was disbarred in February 2014 for misrepresenting prominent human rights victims, including Ahmad Batebi.

Prior to her disbarment, Mazahery's practice primarily focused on immigration law. She assisted individuals who had been victims of human rights violations in Iran and other countries in North Africa, the Middle East, and Asia. Mazahery also advocated for equal rights for women in Islamic countries, including the abolishment of stoning as a form of execution and honour killings.

Disbarment for Ethical Violations

On October 4, 2013, the Board of Professional Responsibility for the District of Columbia Court of Appeals recommended that the D.C. Court of Appeals disbar Mazahery and pay restitution in the amount of $3,241.92 plus interest for multiple acts of dishonesty stemming from her representation of human rights advocates Ahmad Batebi and Kianoosh Sanjari and mishandling of funds relating to the execution of Akram Mahdavi.

The Board found that Mazahery engaged in a "pattern of dishonesty" in these three matters and disclosed client secrets. The Board also found that Mazahery's "ethical violations are simply too serious, too numerous, and adversely affected too many people" and that she had made false statements to the bar, at her hearing, committed perjury and larceny in relation to handling funds intended for Batebi, evaded Sanjari and Batebi when they requested information about their asylum applications and committed deceit regarding donations intended for Mahdavi. In February 2014, Mazahery consented to the disbarment and was subsequently disbarred.

See also
List of Iranian women
Persian women's movement
Human rights in Iran

References and notes

External links

 charges against Lily Mazahery for ethics violations
 Opinion by Ad Hoc Hearing Committee of the District of Columbia Court of Appeals, Board of Professional Responsibility
 Order of Disbarment, District of Columbia Court of Appeals
 news report
 transcript of speech on human rights situation in Iran
 UK Channel 4 News Video Clip on Ahmad Batebi and his human rights work with the help of his lawyer, Lily Mazahery
 First to report Roxana Saberi's release
 Conversation with Delara Darabi's father
 Quoted on new media
 Appearance at 2009 World Technology Summit
 Quoted re: treatment of journalists in Iran
 Quoted re: human rights violations in Iran

1972 births
Living people
Iranian emigrants to the United States
American feminists
American human rights activists
Women human rights activists
American women's rights activists
Disbarred American lawyers
Iranian activists
Iranian women activists
21st-century American women lawyers
21st-century American lawyers